Torodora digna is a moth in the family Lecithoceridae. It was described by Edward Meyrick in 1918. It is found in Assam, India.

The forewings are rather dark fuscous, faintly tinged purplish and with a minute whitish dot on the costa at three-fourths, where very faint traces of a fine pale angulated transverse line proceed. The hindwings are grey.

References

Moths described in 1918
Torodora